"Dominator" is a 1991 song by the electronic music group Human Resource. It was the group's debut single and later appeared on their full-length album Dominating the World. The single reached #36 on the UK singles chart, #6 on Dutch Top 40 and #6 on Belgian Ultratop 50 Singles.

Remixes
There were over 50 remixes with American DJ Joey Beltram's being the most popular in clubs and raves in its year of release. His version includes the characteristic hoover sound, taken from his earlier single "Mentasm". "Dominator (Joey Beltram Remix)" was included on The Pitchfork 500.

Cultural references
Lyrics from "Dominator" were quoted in Scooter's 2003 single "Posse (I Need You on the Floor)". It was reported that Lady Gaga's 2009 single "Bad Romance" sampled the song without permission or recognition but no further legal action was taken. It was also sampled in the Boy Sim song "Break Your Heart", Rihanna's "Birthday Cake" and also in an unreleased Charli XCX song called "Supernova".

Charts

Weekly charts

Year-end charts

References

External links
 

1991 songs
1991 debut singles
House music songs
Techno songs